William Henry Lash III (January 21, 1961 – July 14, 2006) was the Assistant Secretary for Market Access and Compliance at the United States Department of Commerce from 2001 to 2005, and a professor at George Mason University School of Law.

Lash was born in Jersey City, New Jersey and grew up in Rahway, New Jersey.

In July 2006, at his home in McLean, Virginia, Lash was involved in a domestic incident with his wife, which resulted in her leaving the house and calling the police. When they arrived, he refused them entry, and proceeded to fatally shoot his 12-year-old son and then himself.

References

External links
 George Mason University faculty web page

1961 births
2006 suicides
African-American academics
American politicians who committed suicide
Yale University alumni
Harvard Law School alumni
George Mason University faculty
United States Department of Commerce
Murder–suicides in Virginia
Suicides by firearm in Virginia
New Jersey Republicans
Virginia Republicans
People from Rahway, New Jersey
Politicians from Jersey City, New Jersey
20th-century African-American people
21st-century African-American people